The NCAA Division III men's volleyball tournament is a championship event officially sanctioned by the National Collegiate Athletic Association (NCAA), the main governing body for U.S. college sports. Open only to schools in Division III of the NCAA, a group of schools that are not allowed to award athletic scholarships, the championship was established in 2012. The tournament would be followed as the newest NCAA championship event by a single all-divisions championship in women's beach volleyball which began in 2016.

History
The idea of a Division III championship was first floated by several figures in the Eastern Intercollegiate Volleyball Association in the late 1980s, but was long dormant because of NCAA participation rules—50 schools must sponsor a sport before a national championship tournament can be officially sanctioned. The main impetus for growth in Division III volleyball had been an unofficial D-III championship tournament known as the Molten Invitational, started in 1997. In 2010, the required number of programs was reached, leading to the creation of the D-III championship.

Format

The Division III championship began in 2012 with nine teams and has steadily expanded with the growth of D-III men's volleyball. The most recent expansion came for the 2019 season, with the field going from 12 to 14 teams. This differs from the top-level NCAA Men's National Collegiate Volleyball Championship, which involved four teams through the 2013 tournament and expanded to six teams for 2014 and seven for 2018. Like the National Collegiate Championship, the Division III championship is a knockout tournament, with best-of-5-set matches. The current tournament format features six first-round matches, with the winners joining the top two seeds in the quarterfinals.

The tournament was not held in 2020 due to COVID-19, and with a significant number of schools opting out of competition in 2021 due to the still-ongoing pandemic, that year's field was reduced to 12 teams from the intended 14.

Champions
Source =

Footnotes

See also
NCAA Men's Volleyball Championships (Divisions I and II)
NAIA Men's Volleyball Championship

References

Volleyball, Men's
Volleyball, Men, Div III
Men Div III
College men's volleyball in the United States
Volleyball competitions in the United States
USA
Recurring sporting events established in 2012